Charles Calvert (30 August 1768 – 8 September 1832) was a wealthy English brewer and Member of Parliament in the early 19th century.

Calvert was the third son of Southwark brewer Felix Calvert, and was educated at Tonbridge and Harrow Schools. In 1802, he inherited a half-share in his father's brewery, Calvert & Co.

A Whig, he stood for Parliament and was elected as MP for Southwark from 1812 to 1830 and then from 1830 until his death in 1832.

In Parliament, he allied himself with brewers’ interests, often opposing taxes on tobacco, beer and tea for their impacts on the working classes and on manufacturers. He opposed the blockade of Norway in 1814 and the resumption of hostilities with Napoleon, and supported parliamentary reform.

He married Jane, youngest daughter of Sir William Rowley of Tendring Hall, Suffolk, in 1823, and lived at Ockley Court in Surrey and Kneller Hall in Twickenham, west London, up to his death from cholera in September 1832.

References

External links 
 

1768 births
1832 deaths
Members of the Parliament of the United Kingdom for English constituencies
Whig (British political party) MPs for English constituencies
UK MPs 1812–1818
UK MPs 1818–1820
UK MPs 1820–1826
UK MPs 1826–1830
UK MPs 1830–1831
UK MPs 1831–1832